Safarabad (also Romanized as Şafarābād) is a village in Kuhdasht-e Sharqi Rural District, in the Central District of Miandorud County, Mazandaran Province, Iran. At the 2006 census, its population was 85, in 19 families.

References 

Populated places in Miandorud County